Talog is a rural locality (a village) in Askinsky Selsoviet, Askinsky District, Bashkortostan, Russia. The population was 26 as of 2010. There are 4 streets.

Geography 
Talog is located 27 km north of Askino (the district's administrative centre) by road. Verkhnenikolskoye is the nearest rural locality.

References 

Rural localities in Askinsky District